Human Distortion is an EP / MCD by 16-17, released in 1998 through Digital Hardcore Recordings (DHR).

Reception
AllMusic staff writer William York writes: "the Human Distortion EP, which appeared in 1998 on Alec Empire's Digital Hardcore label sounded like the work of a completely different band..."
From the DHR production notes: "Noisy industrial tech-step before everyone else tried to copy the style. Outstanding release on DHR!"

Track listing

Personnel 
Musicians
Alex Buess – saxophone electronics, engineering
Damian Bennett – bass
 – drums
Kevin Martin – samplers, production
Dave Cochrane – bass

Production and additional personnel

Simon Heyworth – mastering
The Pathological Puppy  – Artwork

Release history

References

External links 
 Human Distortion at Discogs

1998 EPs
16-17 EPs